F. P. Jac  (11 November 1955 – 25 December 2008), born Flemming Palle Jakobsen, was a Danish poet.

His first publication was the poetry collection Spontane kalender-blade (Spontaneous Calendar-sheets) from 1976. Even if his production is much "lighter" in tone than his peers of that day, he is counted as belonging to the so-called eighties-generation of poets. He published more than fifty collections of poetry, a few of them in cooperation with some other Danish poets, namely Asger Schnack and Klaus Høeck. His latest work while alive was Søvnlysninger, (Sleeplightings), 2007.

Jac often utilised autobiographical material in his writing, generously twisting everything to an innovative, kind-hearted, humorous and above all distinct voice. Approaching everyday life with a defiant ability to find beauty and oddness he coined many new words describing feelings and situations previously unaccounted for in Danish. This gave him a reputation for being an eccentric with a slanted and highly personal use of language, but also brought him much acclaim among peers and a large fan base. In 2008, 1 month before his death, he was thus awarded the grand prize of the Academy for the Arts for his life achievement in regards to kindling the Danish language.

References

External links 
 Bogrummet.dk (Danish)

Danish male poets
1955 births
2008 deaths
Recipients of the Grand Prize of the Danish Academy
20th-century Danish poets
21st-century Danish poets
20th-century Danish male writers
21st-century Danish male writers